Mott Street is a narrow but busy thoroughfare that runs in a north–south direction in the New York City borough of Manhattan. It is regarded as Chinatown's unofficial "Main Street". Mott Street runs from Bleecker Street in the north to Chatham Square in the south. It is a one-way street with southbound-running vehicular traffic only.

History

Early configuration
Mott Street existed in its current configuration by the mid-18th century. At that time, Mott Street passed just to the east of the Collect Pond; Collect Park today is three blocks to the west at Centre Street. Like many streets that predated Manhattan's grid, Mott Street meandered around natural features of the landscape rather than running through or over them. It was the need to avoid the now-long since paved-over Collect Pond that gave Mott Street its characteristic "bend" to the northeast at Pell Street.

Having been previously known as Old Street, as well as Winne Street (also spelled Wynne) for the section between Pell and Bleecker, Mott Street was renamed in the late 18th century to honor the prominent local family of the same name, likely in particular businessman Joseph Mott, a butcher and tavern owner who provided support to the rebel forces in the American Revolution.

During the 19th century, the lower portion of Mott Street south of Canal Street was part of the Five Points, a notorious slum neighborhood in lower Manhattan. In 1872, Wo Kee, a Chinese merchant, opened a general store on Mott Street near Pell Street. In the years to follow, Chinese immigrants would carve out an enclave around the intersection of Mott, Doyer, and Pell Streets. At the time, it was mostly Guangdongese males who immigrated, and what was to become Chinatown first began as a very small Bachelor's Society. Most of these immigrants were from Taishan, in southwestern Guangdong, China, so as a result it was originally aTaishanese community. That all changed during the 1960s, when an influx of Cantonese immigrants from Hong Kong and Taiwan began arriving, as well. As a result, Chinatown began expanding quickly, and Standard Cantonese, which is spoken in Guangzhou, China and in Hong Kong, became the dominant language of the neighborhood. At the time, Chinatown was emerging and growing as a Little Hong Kong, but the growth slowed down later on. Manhattan's Chinatown has since grown into the largest Chinatown in the United States, engulfing a large swath of the Lower East Side. Nevertheless, the historic heart of Chinatown, as well as the primary destination for tourists, is still Mott Street between Canal Street and Chatham Square. This is center of what is known as the Old Chinatown of Manhattan.

The Beginning of the Chinese Community

Ah Ken is reported to have arrived in the area in 1858; he is the first Chinese person credited as having permanently immigrated to Chinatown. As a Cantonese businessman, Ah Ken eventually founded a successful cigar store on Park Row. He was "probably one of those Chinese mentioned in gossip of the sixties [1860s] as peddling 'awful' cigars at three cents apiece from little stands along the City Hall park fence – offering a paper spill and a tiny oil lamp as a lighter", according to author Alvin Harlow in Old Bowery Days: The Chronicles of a Famous Street (1931).

Later immigrants would similarly find work as "cigar men" or billboard carriers, and Ah Ken's particular success encouraged cigar makers William Longford, John Occoo, and John Ava to also ply their trade in Chinatown, and eventually form a monopoly on the cigar trade.

It has been speculated that it may have been Ah Ken who kept a small boarding house on lower Mott Street and rented out bunks to the first Chinese immigrants to arrive in Chinatown. It was with the profits he earned as a landlord, earning an average of $100 a month, that he was able to open his Park Row smoke shop around which modern-day Chinatown would grow.

Historic Cantonese gangs
For more than 20 years, Cantonese gangs based on Mott Street terrorized Chinatown.  The Ghost Shadows made this street their territory once the On Leong Tong Gang, also known as the On Leong Chinese Merchants Association, that dominated the street, gave their approval. The approval was not easy obtained, since it involved a bloody battle over the territory. Nicky Louie, who immigrated from Hong Kong  to Manhattan's Chinatown in the late 1960s, ran the Ghost Shadows gang with 50 or more members also originating from Hong Kong. With the Ghost Shadows controlling Mott Street during the 1970s, they affiliated with the On Leong Tong. The On Leong Tong were the wealthiest and most influential gang organization in Chinatown. Working with the On Leong earned the Ghost Shadows a portion of money earned by the Tong's activities. The gangs were the guards of the gambling houses in the On Leong territory that operated in the poor conditions of lofts and basements along Mott Street. During the period of the 1980s and 1990s, the gangs also ran a protection racket, whereby shopkeepers paid the gangs a negotiated cash fee for protection. The negotiations often involved drinking tea and were often very peaceful.

The gangs also acted as runners in the Chinatown Connection heroin trade between the Canada–US border and New York, and spread the drug throughout the state. On Leong Gang was like most Chinatown gangs in the past, running a legitimate enterprise, serving as a business collective known as the On Leong Chinese Merchants Association, a crutch for immigrants, even a loan company. The Ghost Shadows were very territorial about Mott Street; in one example, the Ghost Shadows had spotted a White Eagle member walking alone, and kidnapped him by a car, and threw him in the East River, attempting to drown him.

The 1970s was the most violent gang-related period in Chinatown. Gunshots often rang out, and sometimes tourists would be unintentionally injured. Other gangs that existed were Chung Yee, Liang Shan, the Flying Dragons, the White Eagles, and the Black Eagles

Description

In Chinatown

As Chinatown's "Main Street" 

Today this stretch of Mott Street is lined with souvenir shops, tea houses and restaurants, including Wo Hop restaurant at 17 Mott Street and 15 Mott Street, all catering largely to tourists. In 2003, the 32 Mott Street General Store closed due to the effects of the September 11, 2001, attacks on the Chinatown economy. The proximity of the attack along with street closures in lower Manhattan (especially the ongoing closure of Park Row under 1 Police Plaza) had cut off much business to Chinatown. 32 Mott had been the longest continuously operating store in Chinatown, established in 1891.

Mott Street north of Canal Street was historically part of Little Italy. Today it is predominantly Chinese. This section of Mott Street between roughly Canal and Broome Streets has a number of Chinese-owned fish and vegetable markets, as well as some remaining Italian businesses. The commercial establishments here cater more to the day-to-day needs of Chinatown residents than tourists. There are also shops that sell baby jackets, bamboo hats, and miniature Buddhas.

Little Hong Kong/Guangdong
This portion of Chinatown along with the rest of the western portion of Chinatown still continues to be the main center of the Cantonese community since the beginning of Chinatown and the main Chinese business commercial district for the whole Chinatown neighborhood or known as the unofficial center of Chinatown. The western portion of Chinatown is also what was the original size and historic part of Manhattan's Chinatown or known as the Old Chinatown of Manhattan until the eastern part of Chinatown just east of the Bowery became more fully developed due to the influx of Fuzhou immigrants during the 1980s-90s primarily on the East Broadway and Eldridge Street portion, which became the new Chinatown. The Bowery, which once served as the borderline of Chinatown is now the divider between the Cantonese Chinatown to the west and Fuzhou Chinatown to the east.

It continues to be a business district catering to not only the Cantonese customers of the Lower East Side, but also to Cantonese people that reside in more affluent places that are also important customers to Chinatown's businesses. The western portion of Chinatown is also a Little Hong Kong (小香港 siu2 hoeng1 gong2), which was a name that was used at one point to describe Manhattan's Chinatown when the Hong Kong immigrants were pouring into the Chinatown neighborhood and even though not all the Cantonese immigrants are from Hong Kong, this portion of Chinatown has strong Cantonese characteristics, especially with Standard Cantonese language, which is spoken in Hong Kong and Guangzhou, China being used widely.

A new branch of New York Mart opened up in August 2011 on Mott Street, although in the late 2010s, it was renamed to IFresh Supermarket. Just a block away from New York Mart is a Hong Kong Supermarket located on the corner of Elizabeth and Hester Streets. These two supermarkets are among the largest Cantonese supermarkets in Chinatown.

The historic core of the Cantonese Chinatown was bounded by Pell, Mott, Doyer, and Bayard Streets below Canal Street. The latter separated Little Italy to the north and Chinatown to the south from the 1800s until the 1950s. After 1965, newer Cantonese-speaking immigrants expanded the Cantonese Chinatown north to Broome and Kenmare Streets.

Culture

Little Guangdong (小廣東 siu2 gwong2 dung1) or Cantonese Town (粵語埠 jyut6 jyu5 fau6) would be the more appropriate term since Cantonese immigrants do come from different parts of Guangdong province of China. Most of the Chinatown Chinese-businesses still continue to be Cantonese-owned combining with still significant numbers of Cantonese residents of the Lower East Side and Cantonese from other areas contributing to the Chinatown businesses has allowed Cantonese to continue to be Chinatown's lingua franca even though Mandarin as Chinatown's other lingua franca is increasing. Despite the large Fuzhou population to the eastern section of Chinatown, though, Cantonese is still predominant in Mott Street with the rest of the western portion of Chinatown. The long time established Cantonese community stretches onto Pell, Doyer, Bayard, Elizabeth, Mulberry, and Canal Streets and on Bowery in Manhattan's Chinatown.

Due to the migration of Cantonese immigrants into Bensonhurst and Sheepshead Bay/Homecrest sections of Brooklyn, newer Cantonese enclaves have started to emerge in those areas; with several of them within Bensonhurst on 18th Avenue, Bay Parkway and 86th Street and one portion in Sheepshead/Homecrest on Avenue U now they are becoming known as Brooklyn's Little Hong Kong/Guangdong(布碌崙的小香港/廣東), but as of the 2010s, they are still mixed in with other ethnic enclaves and still developing. Although the Cantonese population is more widespread and mixed in Bensonhurst and Sheepshead Bay/Homecrest with other ethnic groups, however it has in recent years surpassed the Cantonese population in Manhattan's Chinatown and with Bensonhurst having the highest concentration of Cantonese speaking Chinese immigrants in Brooklyn now, this neighborhood is slowly taking over as NYC's largest primary center of Cantonese culture in addition there is a declining Chinese population including Chinese businesses are declining in Manhattan's Chinatown due to the gentrification. As a result, Brooklyn's Bensonhurst and Sheepshead Bay are now increasingly becoming the new main attractions for newly arrived Cantonese immigrants into New York City.

Current Status As A Chinese Business Shopping District

However, despite the gentrification going on, Manhattan's Chinatown is still a very busy Chinese business district with many non-Asian tourists and visitors attracted to come to Manhattan's Chinatown to explore Chinese culture and food and do shopping as well including many mainland Chinese tourists also visit the neighborhood. There are also still many Chinese consumers from other parts of the tri state that travel to this neighborhood for their shopping and business needs and as a result, Chinese businesses in Manhattan's Chinatown are still making very great profits, which will lead to the likelihood that it will remain as a Chinese business district for a long time to come even though the Chinese residency population is continuing to decline in the area. However, Mott Street and along with the western Cantonese portion of Manhattan's Chinatown is the main concentration of the busy Chinese business district with a large traffic of Chinese and non-Chinese consumers, which is leading to the high likelihood that the Cantonese portion of Manhattan's Chinatown will be the only or last section to remain as the main significant, if not predominately Chinese shopping business district for visitors and tourists in the future.

In NoLIta

Also in this area is Old St. Patrick's Cathedral, the first Catholic cathedral built in New York (consecrated 1815). The high walls surrounding the church along Mott Street attest to the tension between Protestants and Catholics in New York during the 19th century. The Church of the Transfiguration was also built here, making it the oldest Roman Catholic church in Manhattan. Mott Street runs through Little Australia in NoLIta.

Mott Street terminates at Bleecker Street in Manhattan's NoHo (North of Houston Street) neighborhood.

Food markets and restaurants
Although Chinese food markets can be found in many parts of Manhattan's Chinatown, the portion of Mott Street between Hester and Grand Streets have the highest concentration of Chinese food markets centered together.

Although Chinese and Cantonese restaurants and eateries are easily found everywhere throughout Manhattan's Chinatown, Mott Street contains a larger concentration of Chinese restaurants and Chinese eateries between Worth and Hester Streets. Many sell traditional Cantonese dishes, although there are some significant numbers of other Chinese eateries as well as those of other ethnicities. During the COVID-19 pandemic in New York City, when indoor dining was restricted, many Chinese restaurants and eateries on Mott Street opened up many outdoor dining services.

In November 2021, a Chinese style food court named Mott Street Eatery opened at 98 Mott Street, the first one to exist in Manhattan's Chinatown.

Structures

Chinese Community Centre

The Chinese Community Centre spans 60-64 Mott Street. 62 Mott Street is home to the Chinese Consolidated Benevolent Association (CCBA), the oldest Chinese community service organization of Chinatown established in 1883. In the early history of this organization, it performed a quasi-governmental role for the Chinatown community and financially supported many Chinese residents who had goals to become a business owner as well as providing them training. Today the organization provides services ranging from social services, training in personal and commercial conflict issues and mediation, preserving Chinese Culture as well as helping Chinese Americans to integrate well with mainstream groups, being involved with Chinese-American interests, engages in charity events, sponsorships to educational related activities, and advocate for small businesses. Additional services that are provided to the community are low cost rate Adult English Classes, Naturalization Service, and free tax services.

The New York Chinese School is at 64 Mott Street. Located inside the CCBA building, it is the largest Chinese school in North America and was established in 1909 during the Ching Dynasty of China as an overseas Chinese school. It is Chinatown's center of academic learning on Chinese culture, and history. Cantonese and Mandarin classes are also offered at this school, however the Mandarin programs have challenged the long time traditional dominance of Cantonese programs within the school. This educational institution is affiliated with the CCBA due to its location.

Historical businesses

By 1903, there were four Chinese restaurants established such as Port Arthur, Tuxedo, Imperial, and Chinese Quick Lunch on Mott Street. Other earliest Chinese restaurants existed such as Chatham on Doyers Street and Savoy & Oriental Restaurant on Pell Street. These restaurants were often in competition with each other in the Chinatown community.

Chinese Tuxedo Restaurant
In 1897, the Chinese Tuxedo Restaurant opened as a high class Chinese American Restaurant. The outside design of the restaurant's entrance was a colossal Chinese-Style awning, which was crowned with a large wooden carved Chinese dragon. At the entrance, there was a multi-colored stained glass sign with the word restaurant on it.

There were postcard pictures of this entrance and they were often distributed to customers of this restaurant for free. The restaurant was located on a balcony with carved teakwood panels that seemed to leap out from the rest of the building with the purpose of getting people's attention to it strolling through the streets. There were often many American customers in this restaurant.

The inside restaurant designs were mosaic-designed tile floors and press tin ceilings with a chandelier and a large dragon design. The dining room displayed potted plants surrounding a water fountain, which contained wooden birds supported by a wooden dragon stand to make the restaurant appealing and also for Feng Shui and tabletops were made of inlaid marble. There were teakwood windscreens behind the fountain with the hand-carved design of double layered wood molding that was used as a room divider with curtains set up on them.

The restaurant also had a private dining room and displayed American advertisements such as one example on record, Horton's ice cream including English and Chinese menus as a way to remind customers this restaurant is not located in China and located in America. On record, an omelet stuffed with chicken, lobster, and ham cost $2.00 on their menu. At the time, there was an elevated train rail conveniently next to the location.

Port Arthur Restaurant

The Port Arthur Restaurant was also established in 1897 and operated for more than 85 years. Chu Gam Fai was the original owner who started the business. The restaurant was named after Port Arthur  (now Lushun) a city on the northeastern China coast where in 1904 - 1905 the Siege of Port Arthur marked the first victory of Asian power over European power. The restaurant was located on the second and third floors of 7–9 Mott Street. The entrance to the restaurant was marked by an ornate pagoda-style awning and the building's Chinese pagoda-style balcony would eventually become a trademark for the restaurant. Eventually, an escalator was established in the restaurant to make it easier for customers to access the second and third floors, where diners were seated.

The Port Arthur was the first Chinese restaurant in New York City's Chinatown to obtain a liquor license. The restaurant was known for its delicious Chinese style dishes and delicacies as well as for its authentic Chinese style wall decor, inlaid pearl mahogany tables, teakwood chairs, ornate carved wooden panels, windscreens, lanterns, and chandeliers.

The third floor dining rooms were reserved for private parties and banquets, where many local Chinese residents held wedding parties and family ceremonial dinners. The East Hall upper dining room had a baby grand piano for entertainment, and by 1910, it was redesigned to accommodate long banquet tables. The West Hall upper dining room had no walls or screens to divide the space and each table was set up with only four seats, to accommodate smaller groups. There was also a special upper floor room for a bride's traditional change into different red dresses for various stages of the wedding reception.

The second floor dining area was for smaller groups of customers or after-hours slummers, American tourists in search for exotic adventures. The restaurant also served a special luncheon on the lower dining floor every day from 11am-3pm except for holidays and Sundays.

The restaurant was very conveniently located near an elevated train at Chatham Square and a subway station at Worth Street.

Soy Kee & Company
Below the Port Arthur Restaurant, there was a store named Soy Kee and Company serving as an importer and exporter of Chinese goods selling curios, chinaware, lamps, imported Chinese silks, embroideries, ivory carvings, imported Chinese teas, candies, dried fruits, coffees, canned foods, kimono, pajamas, and other types of accessories. Soy Kee and Company was originally located on 36 Pell Street, then moved to Mott Street in 1897 and then eventually moved outside of the Chinatown neighborhood.

Mott Street General Store

In 1891, a Chinese man named Lok Lee opened up the Mott Street General store. This was the gathering place for the earliest Chinese immigrants to socialize and maintain their kin roots with family and friends. It was very especially important because Chinatown was primarily a bachelor's society. Due to discrimination within the immigration laws during those old days, Chinese men were not allowed to bring their families into America.

This is the oldest Chinese store that remained in the neighborhood for more than 100 years. The store name is Quong Yuen Shing & Co, located in #32 Mott Street. The architecture designs rarely changed with some of the original wooden cabinetry remaining, carved arch above the counter, formal paintings of Chinese women hanging on walls and the original clock from when the shop first opened still continued to tick. The apothecary shelves that display traditional styles of Chinese rice bowls, tea sets, and jade dragons still remained as well. A carved woodwork that twist around the counter is where herbal remedies were once sold. The store sign that once took up the storefront's two box bays are held at the Museum of Chinese in America. In 2003, it closed due to the effects of the September 11 attacks on the Chinatown economy.  In 2004, the historic business reopened under the name, Good Fortune Gifts.

In popular culture

 A line in by Rodgers and Hart's well known song "Manhattan," 1925, is: "And tell me what street / compares with Mott Street in July; / sweet push carts gently gliding by."
 A line in Roger Waters' song "Lost Boys Calling", which is part of The Legend of 1900 movie soundtrack, is: "And in Mott street in July / When I hear those seabirds cry"
 In a series of short stories by pulp writer Arthur J. Burks, published in All Detective Magazine, 1933–34, undercover detective Dorus Noel maintains an apartment near the intersection of Pell and Mott Streets. Burks' Chinatown is riddled with underground passages (which he describes as "rabbit warrens"), and populated by sinister villains and an inexhaustible supply of self-sacrificing Chinese hatchetmen.
 In episode four, season six of Law and Order: Special Victims Unit, a BTK-esque killer hid a clue on top of a pay phone on the corners of Mott Street and Grand Street.
 Revy, one of the main characters of the manga/anime Black Lagoon, is implied to have grown up on Mott Street.
 In Garth Ennis' initial run on The Punisher, Frank Castle's apartment is located off Mott Street.
 In The Godfather Part II, the Genco Olive Oil company was located on Mott Street.
 In David Mamet's The Spanish Prisoner, Susan Ricci lives at 110 Mott Street, "above the Sunshine Bakery".
 The Beastie Boys' "Three MCs and One DJ" music video was shot in a Mott Street building, which, according to the commentary on the Beastie Boys Video Anthology DVD, was also formerly home to Sonic Youth.
 Mott Street was where the title character of Horatio Alger, Jr.'s story "Ragged Dick" found his first "lodgings".
 In the AMC-TV series Rubicon, a safe house address is listed as 701 Mott Street, Apt 2D.
 In Mobsters, Mott Street is referred to as the street where Lucky Luciano grew up and eventually rose to power.
 In "Once Upon a Time in America", a Chinese man helps Noodles (Robert De Niro) escape the armed men trying to kill him, by directing him to run through a door facing Mott Street. "There down. Mott Street. Go. Go. Go," says the Chinese man, encouraging Noodles to hurry up.
In the film Gremlins 2: The New Batch, the Chinatown antique store where Gizmo lived is located off Mott Street.
Mott Street is the location of the famous arcade Chinatown Fair.
 The David Cronenberg film Naked Lunch depicts author William S Burroughs' notorious character Dr. Benway as having an office at Room 401, 1062 Mott St, New York, from which the doctor dispenses a cocktail of pyrethrum and ground black centipede to the film's protagonist, William Lee.
In season 4 episode 2 of Peaky Blinders, Luca Changretta mentions that his uncle is a tailor with a shop on Mott Street
In March 2020, Anna Huang and Chloe Chan founded Mott Street Girls to make Chinese-American history more accessible. The duo hosts historical walking tours in Manhattan's Chinatown that focus on the life of early Chinese immigrants during the Chinese exclusion period.

See also

 Chinatown, Brooklyn
 Brooklyn's Bensonhurst Little Hong Kong/Guangdong
 Brooklyn's Homecrest Little Hong Kong/Guangdong
 Chinatown, Flushing
 Chinatowns in the United States
 List of Chinatowns in the United States

References

External links

 
 New York Songlines: Mott Street, a virtual walking tour

Streets in Manhattan
Chinatown, Manhattan
Chinese-American culture in New York City
Five Points, Manhattan